Oscar Román Acosta  (born 18 October 1964 in Rosario) is a retired Argentine football midfielder who won two Primera División Argentina titles with Ferro Carril Oeste.

Acosta joined Ferro Carril Oeste at the age of 16, in 1982 he was part of the squad that won the club's first ever league title; Nacional 1982. He was also part of the team that won the Nacional in 1984. He played for the club until 1989.

Acosta was selected to join the Argentina squad for Copa América 1987 but he only ever played in one game for his national team.

Acosta also played for Vélez Sársfield, River Plate, San Martín de Tucumán, Banfield, Gimnasia y Esgrima de Jujuy and Argentinos Juniors in the Argentine Primera.

Nicknamed "Bocha" Acosta played abroad for Servette of Switzerland, ANA SC of Japan, Universidad de Chile and Coquimbo Unido of Chile and Barcelona Sporting Club of Ecuador.

Honours

Club
Ferro Carril Oeste
Primera División Argentina (2): 1982, 1984

Universidad de Chile
 Primera División de Chile (1): 1995

External links
 Oscar Román Acosta at BDFA.com.ar 
 Argentine Primera statistics (post 1989)

References 

1964 births
Living people
Footballers from Rosario, Santa Fe
Argentine expatriate footballers
Argentine footballers
Argentina international footballers
1987 Copa América players
Association football midfielders
Ferro Carril Oeste footballers
Club Atlético Vélez Sarsfield footballers
Club Atlético River Plate footballers
Club Atlético Banfield footballers
San Martín de Tucumán footballers
Gimnasia y Esgrima de Jujuy footballers
Argentinos Juniors footballers
Servette FC players
Barcelona S.C. footballers
Universidad de Chile footballers
Coquimbo Unido footballers
Argentine expatriate sportspeople in Chile
Argentine expatriate sportspeople in Ecuador
Argentine expatriate sportspeople in Japan
Argentine expatriate sportspeople in Switzerland
Expatriate footballers in Switzerland
Expatriate footballers in Japan
Expatriate footballers in Chile
Expatriate footballers in Ecuador
Argentine Primera División players
Chilean Primera División players
Swiss Super League players
Pan American Games bronze medalists for Argentina
Medalists at the 1987 Pan American Games
Footballers at the 1987 Pan American Games
Pan American Games medalists in football